Charge-pump phase-locked loop (CP-PLL) is a modification of phase-locked loops with 
phase-frequency detector and square waveform signals. CP-PLL allows for a quick lock of the phase of the incoming signal, achieving low steady state phase error.

Phase-frequency detector (PFD)

Phase-frequency detector (PFD) is triggered by the trailing edges of the reference (Ref) and controlled (VCO) signals. 
A trailing edge of the reference signal forces the PFD to switch to a higher state,
unless it is already in the state .
A trailing edge of the VCO signal forces the PFD to switch to a lower state,
unless it is already in the state .
If both trailing edges happen at the same time, then the PFD switches to zero.

Mathematical models of CP-PLL
A first linear mathematical model of second-order CP-PLL was suggested by F. Gardner in 1980. A nonlinear model without the VCO overload was suggested by M. van Paemel in 1994 
and then refined by N. Kuznetsov et al. in 2019. The closed form mathematical model of CP-PLL taking into account the VCO overload is derived in.

These mathematical models of CP-PLL allow to get analytical estimations of the hold-in range 
(a maximum range of the input signal period 
such that there exists a locked state at which the VCO is not overloaded) 
and the pull-in range (a maximum range of the input signal period 
within the hold-in range  such that for any initial state the CP-PLL 
acquires a locked state).

Continuous time linear model of the second order CP-PLL and Gardner's conjecture
Gardner's analysis is based on the following approximation: time interval on which PFD has non-zero state on each period of reference signal is 

Then averaged output of charge-pump PFD is 

with corresponding transfer function

Using filter transfer function  and VCO transfer function  one gets Gardner's linear approximated average model of second-order CP-PLL

In 1980, F. Gardner, based on the above reasoning, conjectured that  transient response of practical charge-pump PLL's can be expected to be nearly the same as the response of the equivalent classical PLL (Gardner's conjecture on CP-PLL). 
Following Gardner's results, by analogy with the Egan conjecture on the pull-in range of type 2 APLL, Amr M. Fahim conjectured in his book that in order to have an infinite pull-in(capture) range, an active filter must be used for the loop filter in CP-PLL (Fahim-Egan's conjecture on the pull-in range of type II CP-PLL).

Continuous time nonlinear model of the second order CP-PLL
Without loss of generality it is supposed that trailing edges of the VCO and Ref signals occur 
when the corresponding phase reaches an integer number.
The PFD state  is determined by the PFD initial state , 
the initial phase shifts of the VCO  
and Ref  signals.

The relationship between the input current  and the output voltage  for a
proportionally integrating (perfect PI) filter based on  resistor and capacitor is as follows

where  is a resistance,  is a capacitance,
The control signal  adjusts the VCO frequency:

where  is the VCO free-running (quiescent) frequency
(i.e. for ), 
Finally, the continuous time nonlinear mathematical model of CP-PLL is as follows

with the following discontinuous piece-wise constant nonlinearity

and the initial conditions .
This model is a nonlinear, non-autonomous, discontinuous, switching system.

Discrete time nonlinear model of the second-order CP-PLL

The reference signal frequency is assumed to be constant:

where ,   and 
are a period, frequency and a phase of the reference signal.
Let . 
Denote by  the first instant of time such that the PFD output becomes zero
(if , then )
and by  the first trailing edge of the VCO or Ref.
Let .
Denote by  the PFD pulse width (length of the time interval,
where the PFD output is a non-zero constant), multiplied by the sign of the PFD output: 
If the VCO trailing edge hits before the Ref trailing edge,
then  and in the opposite case we have , i.e.  shows how one signal lags behind another. Zero output of PFD  on the interval :
The transformation of variables  to

allows to reduce the number of parameters to two:

Finally, the discrete-time model of second order CP-PLL without the VCO overload

where

If the VCO is overloaded, i.e.  is zero, 
or what is the same:  
 or
, 
then the additional cases of the CP-PLL dynamics 
have to be taken into account.
For any parameters the VCO overload may occur for sufficiently large frequency difference between the VCO and reference signals.
In practice the VCO overload should be avoided.

Nonlinear models of high-order CP-PLL
Derivation of nonlinear mathematical models of high-order CP-PLL leads to transcendental phase equations that cannot be solved analytically and require numerical approaches like the classical fixed-point method or the Newton-Raphson approach.

References 

Electronic circuits